Luca Sperandio (born 28 January 1996) is an Italian rugby union player. His usual position is as a Wing, and he currently plays for Albi.	 

Born in Treviso and raised by the Benetton entourage, Luca won Under 16 and Under 18 Italian Championships with the green-and-white club from la Marca before being called at only 18 to compete in the National Championship of Excellence – the country's main senior Championship – with Mogliano.

Since joining Benetton Treviso from Mogliano at the end of last season Sperandio has worked hard to become one of the key weapons in coach Kieran Crowley’s arsenal.

A natural try scorer, the former Italy U20 runner stands at 6 ft 1in and around 100 kg but is gifted with some excellent speed and a rare agility, making him a reliable option in almost every spot in the backs.

But it is on either wing where he is most at home and he is one of the few naturally powerful wingers in Italy's pipeline for the long-term future.

Sperandio has been involved in almost every Italian Squad at junior level, and he enjoyed Six Nations Under 20 campaigns and a couple of Junior World Championships, scoring a try against Georgia last year in England.

His Guinness Pro12 debut came on the last weekend of November at Thomond Park and he hasn't stop playing since. He played with Benetton until 2021–22 United Rugby Championship season.

He was picked by Crowley in the starting XV that twice beat Bayonne in the European Rugby Challenge Cup in December and then went on to score tries in successive League games against Zebre and Glasgow Warriors the following weekends.

Even if he still has a lot to learn on the tactical and positional aspects of his game, his rapid growth makes him one of the most highly anticipated players in the country's future, though it may be not too long until Conor O'Shea calls him to join the Azzurri setup.

Until then he will remain a player to watch for Benetton Treviso and one of the top-rated Italian youngsters taking to the field in the Guinness PRO12.

On the 8 December 2021, he was selected by Alessandro Troncon to be part of an Emerging Italy 27-man squad for the 2021 end-of-year rugby union internationals.

International tries 
As of 3 June 2022

References

External links
ESPN Profile

1996 births
Living people
Italian rugby union players
Italy international rugby union players
Rugby union wings
Mogliano Rugby players
Benetton Rugby players